The real (plural réis) was the currency of Portuguese Guinea until 1914. It was equal to the Portuguese real. Paper money specifically for Portuguese Guinea was first issued in 1909, supplementing Portuguese currency. Denominations were between 1000 réis (1 mil réis) and 50 mil réis.

The real was replaced by the escudo at a rate of 1 escudo = 1000 réis.

References

Currencies of Africa
Economic history of Portugal
Modern obsolete currencies
1914 disestablishments in Portuguese Guinea
Currencies of Portugal
Economy of Guinea-Bissau
1909 establishments in Portuguese Guinea